Karen Smyers (born September 1, 1961 in Corry, Pennsylvania) is a triathlete from the United States. She is the 1990 and 1995 ITU Triathlon World Champion as well as the 1995 Ironman World Champion. She was inducted into the Triathlon Hall of Fame in January 2009. She is diagnosed thyroid cancer in 1999.https://www.karensmyers.com/death-of-a-thyroid-my-diagnosis-and-treatment-for-thyroid-cancer/

References

External links
Profile and race results at triathlon.org

1961 births
American female triathletes
Ironman world champions
Living people
People from Corry, Pennsylvania
Triathletes at the 1995 Pan American Games
Pan American Games gold medalists for the United States
Pan American Games medalists in triathlon
Medalists at the 1995 Pan American Games
21st-century American women